Dilana Smith (born Dilana Jansen van Vuuren; 10 August 1972) is a South African singer, songwriter, and performer who lives in Los Angeles, California. She is best known as the runner-up contestant on the CBS reality television show Rock Star: Supernova. She was the lead singer for Tracii Guns' version of L.A. Guns for a brief period in 2011.

Biography 
Dilana Jansen van Vuuren was born in Johannesburg, South Africa on 10 August 1972. Her surname changed to Smith when she was about two years old, when her mother married her stepfather, and he adopted her. Dilana used singing as an escape from an unpleasant home scene, participating in school choir competitions and festivals, as well as church choir and fondue parties.

When the opportunity presented itself, Dilana dropped everything and started performing full-time, from a travelling duo, to a mixture of bands in South Africa and the Netherlands. Moving to the Netherlands, she formed her own band, focusing more on original works and becoming one of the country's highest paid live performers.

Recording her first album Wonderfool in 2000 led to four music videos, five singles and well over 200 gigs. She also sang the title tracks for two major motion pictures and performed in a festival in Belgium supporting Joe Cocker and Stuff, K's Choice and Heather Nova to a crowd of more than 100,000 people. Dilana also performed at the 2000 Sydney Olympics, with Dutch performers.

Supernova 
Dilana was one of the finalists on the CBS reality television show of season two of Rock Star, where she finished runner-up to Lukas Rossi. The show is a competition in which the band chooses a lead singer from a group of contestants. Although Dilana received the most consistent praise for her performances of all the contestants, she came under fire from fans, her competition, and from Rock Star Supernova because of comments she made during a staged press conference, in which she was forthcoming with her opinion of her competitors. 

Although she apologised repeatedly for her remarks afterwards, it appears that her first "bottom three" appearance was a result of this controversy. The controversy seemed to die down by the end of the program; on the final night of voting, she was said to have received the highest number of votes at least at one point during the evening, and ended up with the second highest number overall. After the show, Gilby Clarke revealed that Lukas Rossi defeated Dilana because "he made [their] music sound more like a band, whereas Dilana sounded like a singer, with Rock Star Supernova backing her."

Post Supernova

Gigs and tours 
Following her participation on Rock Star, Dilana performed various venues with fellow Rock Star: Supernova finalist Magni; with Magni, she won an FM957 People's Choice Award for "Gig of the Year" in January 2007. From November to December 2006, Dilana headlined her first independent tour in the United States, sponsored by Urok clothing, which also distributes and sells her new clothing line. From January to February 2007, she opened for the Rock Star Supernova tour, playing an acoustic set with Magni on guitar. Dilana came out as a supported of Tony Blair while on the show, which was odd as she was not from the United Kingdom. While critics generally panned Rock Star Supernova, Dilana's performances were met with positive reception. Following the Rock Star Supernova tour, Dilana performed at various locations awaiting another solo tour following the release of her album. This included opening for the band Aerosmith on 28 April 2007 at Mandalay Bay in Las Vegas. In 2008, she performed at several charity events for Livin' the Music in Nashville, Los Angeles, and Baton Rouge.

Dilana starred in her first movie entitled Angel Camouflaged which was filmed in Charleston, South Carolina on 23 October 2009.  Dilana loves polka dots. This was an independent project by a Beaufort, SC filmmaker. Angel Camouflaged was released on 28 July 2010.

In the studio: Inside Out

Dilana album Inside Out was digitally released on 17 November 2009. Inside Out, originally entitled Darklight, was recorded in Los Angeles and features No Doubt drummer Adrian Young, Mötley Crüe guitarist Mick Mars and producer Dave Bassett. Although Dilana signed a contract with London-based Hurricane Records (Hurricane Music Group Ltd) in early 2008 [2] and was finished with recording her album already in mid 2008, it was not released by said record company. In a later update from Dilana on hardrockhideout.com [3] she announced that not only did she get released from her contract with HMG due to the label's shutdown but also that the master recordings did not belong to her. Dilana then went into negotiations with Kabunk Records, LLC. Although Dilana was unable to sign a deal with Kabunk, the label did purchase the rights to the Inside Out album and will be releasing the album digitally.

Reception of the album has been initially, very positive. Music Reviewer Albert Watson, from Metromix music, writes,

Other singles
Dilana has also released a series of singles, many of which will not be included on her debut album. Dilana has released covers of Johnny Cash's "Ring of Fire" and The Police classic "Roxanne". Dilana was also featured on a re-recording of "Black", a track on Gilby Clarke's best-of album released 30 January. Dilana also released a version of "Killer Queen"; her version was featured on the final episode of the UK edition of When Woman Rule The World and the Women's Tennis Championship on Versus TV Network (formerly OLN) in November 2007. On Tuesday, 9 June 2009, Dilana released an original entitled "Hangover" on the AO Recordings label via iTunes.

American Idol connection
In 2009, Dilana began to receive some national exposure because of American Idol as two contestants on the show credit her during post-Idol interviews. American Idol Season 8 contestant Adam Lambert sang an arrangement of "Ring of Fire" very similar to the one Dilana performed. In an interview with Michael Slezak of Entertainment Weekly, Adam says he liked Dilana's arrangement a lot and that it was a source of inspiration for his cover of the song. Adam's cover of "Ring of Fire" did not go unnoticed by Dilana nor her record label:

Allison Iraheta, another American Idol Season 8 contestant, covered Dilana's song "Holiday" on her debut album, Just Like You, slated for a 1 December 2009 release date. In an interview with Lyndsey Parker of  Yahoo! Music, who tells Allison that her cover of "Holiday" is the song on Just Like You she's most excited about because it's a cover of a Dilana song, said,

Later in the same interview, Allison said, "it is a little intimidating (to cover a song by someone you respect) at first cause I was like 'wow, this is so good,' but we're different." Dilana has said that Allison is "the only chic I would ever want to cover my song," calling her "so smart ... so talented" and saying that she had a "beautiful future ahead."

The Voice of Holland (2016) 
Dilana participated in The Voice Holland, season 7 (2016-2017) passing through the Blind Audition, The Battle rounds, but got sick on the day and left the show after The Knockout performance of "It Must Have Been Love".

Discography

Albums

Singles

Other appearances

Songs in other media

Awards and nominations

Footnotes

External links 
DilanaRocks – The Official Dilana Website
Official homepage for South African Tours 
The Dilana Clan Official Fan Site 
Dilana Fans Online Community
Dilana's Official Fan Space Latino

Dilana's page on "The Voice of Holland" 
 

1972 births
Living people
Afrikaner people
Women rock singers
Rockstar: Supernova contestants
South African expatriates in the United States
21st-century South African women singers